Decade of Debauchery is the first compilation album by Swedish industrial metal band Deathstars, released on 29 October 2010 in Europe via Nuclear Blast records. The album contains remixes, previously unreleased tracks from other albums and demos.

Track listing

References 

2010 compilation albums
Deathstars albums